Yurii Shirokov, (Широков, Юрий Михайлович 21.6.1921—5.7.1980) was a writer, physicist, and professor. He graduated from Moscow State University (Moscow) in 1948. He worked in the same university, then in the Steklov Mathematical Institute (Moscow). He wrote more than 100 scientific papers

and several monographs, among which the textbook "Nuclear Physics" is particularly relevant.
.

Algebra of generalized functions

Yu.Shirokov had constructed the Algebra of Generalized functions. Then it was applied to various systems
.

Classical and quantum mechanics
Shirokov was, perhaps, not the first to mention that quantum mechanics has many classical limits. The most known limiting cases of quantum mechanics are classical waves and Newtonian mechanics. Shirokov has systematised the construction of classical limits of quantum mechanics, see
.

Development of Shirokov's ideas 
The most important ideas about the quantum mechanics and the theoretical physics in general formulated by 
Shirokov are not yet developed. In particular, the field theory in terms of wave packets (i.e., without divergent terms and without divergent series) is not yet constructed.

References

1921 births
1980 deaths
Moscow State University alumni
Academic staff of Moscow State University
Soviet physicists